Duilio Beretta and Renzo Olivo are the defending champions but Olivo decided no to participate.
Beretta played alongside Andrea Collarini and lost in the Quarterfinals to Nicolás Barrientos and Eduardo Struvay.
Marcelo Arévalo and Sergio Galdós defeated Alejandro González and Carlos Salamanca 6–3, 6–4 in the final.

Seeds

Draw

Draw

References
 Main Draw

2013 Manta Open-Doubles
2013 Doubles